Chegg, Inc., is an American education technology company based in Santa Clara, California. It provides homework help, digital and physical textbook rentals, textbooks, online tutoring, and other student services.

The company was launched in 2005, and began trading publicly on the New York Stock Exchange in November 2013. As of March 2020, the company reported having 2.9 million subscribers to Chegg Services.
The services provided by Chegg have been controversial because there have been reports of student cheating using Chegg services.

History
In October 2000, Iowa State University students Josh Carlson, Mike Seager, and Mark Fiddleke launched Chegg's forerunner, Cheggpost, a Craigslist-style message board for Iowa State students. Chegg is a combination of the words chicken and egg, and references the founders’ catch-22 feeling of being unable to obtain a job without experience, while being unable to acquire experience without a job.

Carlson then teamed with Iowa State MBA Osman Rashid, an avid user of the site who recognized its potential to disrupt the textbook market, which had "drastically outpaced the rate of inflation". The company was incorporated in 2005 by Carlson, Rashid, and Aayush Phumbhra. At that time, it offered scholarship searches, internship matching, and college application advice. Some initial start-up funding was provided by Rashid.

In February 2006, Carlson left the company. Phumbhra and Rashid rebranded, launching Chegg, Inc. in December 2007, with Rashid as CEO. After ending services unrelated to renting and purchasing textbooks, the company adjusted its business model to reflect that of Netflix's rental-based model, concentrating on renting textbooks to students, and Chegg expanded to a national market. It later added goods and student services through corporate acquisitions.

In 2008, revenues were about $10 million; in 2009, revenues for the month of January were reported as $10 million.

Following a brief tenure by former Ask.com and Match.com CEO Jim Safka in 2009, former Guitar Hero CEO Dan Rosensweig was appointed CEO in 2010.

Chegg began trading shares publicly on the New York Stock Exchange in November 2013. Its IPO was reported to have raised $187.5 million, with an initial market capitalization of about $1.1 billion.

In 2014, Chegg entered a partnership with book distributor Ingram Content Group to distribute all of Chegg's physical textbook rentals.

In April 2017, Chegg and Pearson Education began a textbook rental partnership; In the pilot program, the publisher Pearson made 50 editions of high-volume textbooks (both digital and print) available only to rent. Chegg served as the exclusive rental outlet.

In September 2018, Chegg announced a data breach had occurred in April 2018 that may have involved 40 million active and inactive registered users. The breach may have included data such as user names, Chegg passwords, email addresses, and shipping addresses. The company reported that social security numbers and bank account information were not affected by the breach.

As of March 2020, the company reported having 2.9 million subscribers to Chegg Services.

In June 2021, Chegg unveiled Uversity, a new educational platform that will provide a space for professors and other educators to share content. In the same year, Chegg partnered with Varkey Foundation to launch Global Student Prize to recognise outstanding students that make an impact to local or international communities.

Acquisitions
In 2010, Chegg made its first acquisition, purchasing CourseRank, which was disabled in 2014. In the same year, Chegg also acquired Cramster, a provider of online homework help, and Notehall, an online marketplace for class notes.

In 2011, Chegg acquired Zinch, a scholarship search and networking service for high school students and college recruiters, and continues to offer the service, under the Chegg brand name. Chegg acquired software company 3D3R in late 2011 to develop its digital textbook product, kickstart its mobile product group, and open an engineering office in Rehovot, Israel. In June 2014 Chegg acquired online tutoring platform InstaEDU, for a reported $30 million, renaming the division Chegg Tutors, and in October 2014 it acquired Internships.com.

In 2017 Chegg acquired RefME, a free citation management tool available on web, iOS and Android. It was shut down on March 7, 2017,  and user accounts were transferred over to CiteThisForMe, Chegg's own citation service.

Chegg acquired Imagine Easy Solutions, a provider of online bibliography and research tools, for a reported $42 million, in 2016. In 2017, the company acquired Cogeon GmbH, a German math education provider, for $15 million cash;

In 2018, Chegg acquired WriteLab, which uses AI to analyze text and suggest improvements, and online flash card tool StudyBlue.

During late 2019, Chegg acquired online coding, design, and data science school Thinkful, for $80 million cash plus $20 million in cash or stock based on performance.

In 2021, Chegg acquired the language learning software service Busuu for $436 million. Busuu, a once private company, is now fully integrated into Chegg.

Leadership

As of 2021, Chegg's board of directors consists of:
Dan Rosensweig, co-chair, president and CEO at Chegg
 Sarah Bond, Microsoft Corporation
 Richard Sarnoff, co-chair at Chegg; chair at KKR & Co.
 Renee Budig, EVP and CFO at CBS Interactive
Melanie Whelan, Summit Partners
Marne Levine, VP at Facebook
 Ted Schlein, partner at Kleiner Perkins
Jed York, co-chair at San Francisco 49ers
Paul J. LaBlanc, president at Southern New Hampshire University

Student cheating
Some services offered by Chegg have been repeatedly documented as being problematic. These services include "homework help" where "Chegg experts" solve homework questions for students. Academic file-sharing also occurs in the form of students posting homework question sheets soliciting answers. Academic file-sharing has been documented as being a form of violation of academic integrity at many schools.

In February 2019, Chegg formed a partnership with Purdue University's Online Writing Lab (OWL), to make online educational writing tools more accessible to its students. The affiliation was met by some faculty criticism, alluding to Chegg helping students cheat; OWL director Harry Denny reported that he did not expect Purdue's reputation to suffer as a result, stating, "My experience has been that the company is committed to partnering with faculty and administration to address their concerns." Purdue University prohibits students soliciting answers using Chegg's homework help: "While Chegg can be helpful to access textbooks and more practice problems, using this resource to find assignment answers is considered academic dishonesty because it is a form of copying and plagiarism.".

A report published by Citron Research in July 2019 claims that "Chegg has created forums to circumvent Turnitin, proving that Chegg is helping users continue institutionalized cheating".

During the 2020 COVID-19 pandemic, controversy around Chegg and companies offering similar services escalated, as many students had to learn from home with uncensored internet access. For example, Georgia Tech alerted students in a physics class that certain students in the class had cheated on their online final exam by using answers posted on Chegg, certain students in a chemistry class at Boston University were found to have similarly cheated on an online exam, students from two chemistry classes at the University of British Columbia were accused of using Chegg for cheating on exams, including using two incorrect answers posted on Chegg, and solutions to a physics exam at Washington University in St. Louis were posted on Chegg during the exam period. Chegg cooperated with the investigations. A study published in 2020 has found that Chegg answers student questions even though the questions have clear cues to indicate that the student is trying to buy answers for a current assessed activity—the questions are neither identified nor flagged as violations of academic integrity anywhere in the process.
Some universities explicitly forbid students from using Chegg's homework help services.

Some professors have responded to students using Chegg to cheat on assignments and exams by posting fake responses to the questions themselves, in an effort to catch students who used Chegg to cheat by seeing who used the fake solution as their answer on the assignment or exam. 

It has also been reported that students have been subjected to blackmail after having used the services of Chegg.

While Chegg shared information such as usernames, emails, or IP addresses to colleges, in August of 2022, Chegg changed its "honor code policy" to limit the information they provide to universities and colleges. Chegg says that this change is to protect student privacy. 

In England's Higher Education Cheating Services Prohibition Bill, Chegg has been mentioned as an example of a website offering cheating services.

Chegg Services and textbook rentals
By 2016, textbook rentals and student services were about even in company revenues; by 2018, Chegg Services reported 3.1 million subscribers, with services accounting for 79% of revenue. Students may search for both scholarships and internships on the website, and typically pay to access Chegg Services, such as Study, Advanced Writing, Tutors, and Math Solver, on a monthly basis.

Chegg was sued by Pearson for breach of copyright in 2021, alleging that Chegg infringed on its copyright by selling answers to end-of-chapter questions included in Pearson textbooks.

Music 101
Chegg sponsors music instruction contests for colleges in a program named Music 101. These conclude with live classroom instruction by noted music artists, and a $10,000 grant from its David B. Goldberg Music Scholarship fund for the winning school music department. In 2019, the company launched its ninth annual Chegg Music 101 campaign featuring YUNGBLUD. Previous events have featured U2, Imagine Dragons, Taylor Swift, Ed Sheeran, Shawn Mendes, Steve Aoki, and Liam Payne.

See also
 Amazon textbook rentals
 BookRenter
 Course Hero
 CourseSmart
 Books on Google Play
 Tutor.com
 Zovio

References

External links 
 

2005 establishments in California
Book rental
Book selling websites
Cheating in school
Companies based in Santa Clara, California
Companies listed on the New York Stock Exchange
Education companies of the United States
Education companies established in 2005
Retail companies established in 2005
Internet properties established in 2005
Textbook business
2013 initial public offerings
American educational websites
Online tutoring